John Riddell may refer to:

John Riddell (genealogist) (1785–1862), Scottish peerage lawyer
Jack Riddell (born 1931), Canadian politician
John Riddell (Marxist), Marxist writer and former leader of the Revolutionary Workers League in Canada
Sir John Riddell, 13th Baronet of Riddell (1934–2010)
John Carre Riddell (1809–1879), politician in colonial Victoria (Australia)
John Leonard Riddell (1807–1865), American scientist and author
 John Riddell, pseudonym of humorist Corey Ford, used for satiric book reviews
 John Riddell, a fictional character in Dinosaurs on a Spaceship
 7 News Adelaide newsreader alongside Jane Doyle

See also
John Riddle (disambiguation)